Blake D. Lothian (born July 26, 2002) is an American professional stock car racing driver. He competes part-time in the NASCAR Camping World Truck Series, driving the No. 43 Toyota Tundra/Chevrolet Silverado for Reaume Brothers Racing.

Racing career

Short track racing
Lothian would get his start in racing at the age of five, racing go-karts.

From 2014–2017, he would race in the F1 Boston Series, eventually winning the championship in 2017. In the same year, he would also win the Summer 2017 New Hampshire Karting Association Series Championship.

In 2019, he would spend the majority of races driving for Rev Racing, driving legend cars.

NASCAR
In 2019, Lothian was announced as one of eight drivers in the NASCAR Drive for Diversity Youth Driver Development Program.

On April 4, 2022, it was announced that Lothian would make his NASCAR Camping World Truck Series debut in the No. 43 truck for Reaume Brothers Racing at Martinsville Speedway.

ARCA Menards Series
In 2022, Lothian would participate in an ARCA Menards Series testing session for Mullins Racing.

Personal life
Lothian, in an interview with the West Georgian, revealed he has Attention deficit hyperactivity disorder (ADHD). His favorite NASCAR driver is Michael McDowell. He graduated in the Class of 2021 at Wellesley High School.

Motorsports career results

NASCAR
(key) (Bold – Pole position awarded by qualifying time. Italics – Pole position earned by points standings or practice time. * – Most laps led.)

Camping World Truck Series

References

External links
 Official website
 

2002 births
Living people
NASCAR drivers
Sportspeople from Massachusetts
Racing drivers from Massachusetts